John Ure may refer to:

Sir John Ure (diplomat) (born 1931), British ambassador and author
Ian Ure (John Francombe Ure, born 1939), Scottish former footballer
Sir John Ure (Lord Provost) (1824–1901), Lord Provost of Glasgow, 1880–1883